The Battle of Niḫriya was the culminating point of the hostilities between the Hittites and the Assyrians for control over the remnants of the former empire of Mitanni.

When Hittite king Šuppiluliuma I (r. c. 1344–1322 BC) conquered Mitanni, he created two provinces (Aleppo and Carchemish), and distributed the large part of territories of this kingdom between his allies. The rest of what had been the empire of Mitanni retained its independence as a Hittite vassal state called Ḫanigalbat. During the reign of the Hittite king Mursili III (better known as Urḫi-Tešub), Ḫanigalbat was conquered by the Assyria Empire and the Assyrians controlled the East bank of the Euphrates. When Ḫattusili III ousted his nephew Urḫi-Tešub and seized the Hittite throne, he had to be content with the permanent loss of Ḫanigalbat to the Assyrians despite its former status as a Hittite vassal state.

The Assyrian involvement in Syria continued under the command of king Sulmanu-ašared I and precipitated a crisis with Ḫatti.  The Hittites considered Assyrian involvement to be a clear attack on the frontiers of their empire and went into battle under their king: Tudḫalia IV, Ḫattusili's son and successor. This led to a major battle which is known today as the Battle of Niḫriya. A letter (RS 34.265) giving details of the campaign and its outcome was sent by Sulmanu-ašared to Ugarit.

In addition, information within Hittite document KBo IV 14 has been interpreted to show that the battle must have occurred around the 20th year of Sulmanu-ašared's reign.

The former idea that Niḫriya was to be equated with Na’iri, along the Upper Tigris, has been shown to be wrong. As per the Mari and Dur-Katlimmu letters, Niḫriya was located in the Upper Balikh region.

Outcome
The conflict between the two great powers took place in the neighborhood of Nihriya, with the Assyrians gaining a decisive victory. The Assyrian victory shook the Hittite state to its foundations as its king Tudhaliya IV faced several internal revolts against his reign. Tudhaliya IV would ultimately overcome all these challenges to his authority and retain the kingship of Hatti. Hostilities between Assyria and Ḫatti continued for some five years before a peace was negotiated and maintained.

Notes

See also

Short chronology timeline

13th century BC
2nd-millennium BC conflicts
Middle Assyrian Empire
Battles involving Assyria
Battles involving the Hittite Empire
2nd millennium BC in Assyria